Cravens Field is a multi-purpose stadium on the campus of Lamar High School in Arlington, Texas. From 1977 through their 1979 season, the Texas–Arlington college football team utilized Cravens Field as their home stadium. The Mavericks moved their games as a result of construction at Arlington Stadium scheduled when their season was normally played.

References
 

Defunct college football venues
Texas–Arlington Mavericks football
UT Arlington Mavericks sports venues
Multi-purpose stadiums in the United States
American football venues in the Dallas–Fort Worth metroplex
Sports venues in Arlington, Texas
Sports venues completed in 1975